The yellow-bellied blind snake (Ramphotyphlops flaviventer) is a species of snake in the Typhlopidae family.

References

Ramphotyphlops
Reptiles described in 1864
Taxa named by Wilhelm Peters